In Spite of Ourselves is the 13th studio album of John Prine, featuring duets with various well-known women folk and alt-country vocalists, released in 1999.

The album was Prine's first release since successfully battling throat cancer. The duet partners include Iris DeMent, Connie Smith, Lucinda Williams, Trisha Yearwood, Melba Montgomery, Emmylou Harris, Dolores Keane, Patty Loveless, and his wife, Fiona Prine.

Reception

Writing for Allmusic, critic Michael B. Smith wrote the album "ranks as one of Prine's finest works, a scrapbook of country classics, interpreted by some of the genre's best female vocalists, in duet with one fine American singer and a great songwriter." Music critic Bill Frater wrote "To begin with, long-time John Prine fans might be a little put off by this new release. There is only one Prine-penned song in the bunch, In Spite of Ourselves, the title track... I love this album, and I applaud Prine proclaiming his love for these kinds of songs." Robert Christgau gave the album an A rating, and had particular praise for Iris DeMent, writing "... the costar is Iris DeMent, who kills on both the Bobby Braddock cornpone of "(We're Not) The Jet Set" (rhymes with "Chevro-let set") and the conflicted spouse-swapping of the impossible old George & Melba hit "Let's Invite Them Over"—as well as Prine's only new copyright, the title track, in which a husband and wife who love each other to death paint totally different pictures of their marriage."

Critic David Cantwell of No Depression specifically singled out the title track as the best duet on the album and wrote that the album "is a solid collection of country duets, and if nothing else, it proves that Prine has great taste in old country songs... not to mention great taste in what used to be called "girl singers."

Track listing

Chart performance

References

1999 albums
John Prine albums
Oh Boy Records albums
Vocal duet albums